Paralaudakia stoliczkana (common name Mongolia rock agama) is a species of lizard in the family Agamidae. The species is native to Xinjiang and Gansu provinces in China, the western parts of Mongolia, and to Kyrgyzstan. There are two recognized subspecies.

Etymology
The specific name, stoliczkana, is in honor of Moravian zoologist Ferdinand Stoliczka.

Subspecies
The following two subspecies are recognized as being valid.
Paralaudakia stoliczkana altaica 
 Paralaudakia stoliczkana stoliczkana 

Nota bene: A trinomial authority in parentheses indicates that the subspecies was originally described in a genus other than Paralaudakia.

Distribution and habitat
P. stoliczkana is found in western China, Mongolia, and Kyrgyzstan. Its preferred natural habitats are shrubland, forest, and desert. It occurs in at least one protected area.

Reproduction
P. stoliczkana is oviparous.

Conservation
Though the exact number of individuals of P. stoliczkana is unknown, its population is stable. It occurs in a protected area. The IUCN Red List classes it as of least concern. It is threatened by mining, trapping, and hunting. Both locally and internationally, it is used in medicine and as food.

References

Further reading
Baig KJ, Wagner P, Ananjeva NB, Böhme W (2012). "A morphology-based taxonomic revision of Laudakia Gray, 1845 (Squamata: Agamidae)". Vertebrate Zoology 62 (2): 213–260. (Paralaudakia stoliczkana, new combination, p. 240).
Blanford WT (1875). "List of Reptilia and Amphibia collected by the late Dr. Stoliczka in Kashmir, Ladák, Eastern Turkestán, and Wakhán, with descriptions of new Species".  Journal of the Asiatic Society of Bengal 44: 191–196. (Stellio stoliczkanus, new species, pp. 191–192). (in English and Latin).
Boulenger GA (1885). Catalogue of the Lizards in the British Museum (Natural History). Second Edition. Volume I. ... Agamidæ. London: Trustees of the British Museum (Natural History). (Taylor and Francis, printers). xii + 436 pp. + Plates I–XXXII. (Agama stoliczkana, new combination, pp. 360–361).
Sindaco R, Jeremčenko VK (2008). The Reptiles of the Western Palearctic. 1. Annotated Checklist and Distributional Atlas of the Turtles, Crocodiles, Amphisbaenians and Lizards of Europe, North Africa, Middle East and Central Asia. (Monographs of the Societas Herpetologica Italica). Latina, Italy: Edizioni Belvedere. 580 pp. . 

Paralaudakia
Reptiles of China
Reptiles of Central Asia
Reptiles of Mongolia
Reptiles described in 1875
Taxa named by William Thomas Blanford